Pedro Acosta may refer to:

 Pedro Acosta (footballer) (born 1959), Venezuelan football manager and former player
 Pedro Acosta (motorcyclist) (born 2004), Spanish motorcycle racer